Dornogovi (East Gobi) is one of the 21 aimags (provinces) of Mongolia. It is located in the southeast of the country, bordering PR China's autonomous region of Inner Mongolia.

Dornogovi is located in the Gobi desert and frequent sand- and snow storms amplify the hard weather conditions of Mongolia.

Dornogovi has ample reserves of groundwater, but no lakes or rivers.

Administrative subdivisions

* - tosgon (urban-type settlement).
** -  The aimag capital Sainshand

References

 
Provinces of Mongolia
Gobi Desert
States and territories established in 1931
1931 establishments in Mongolia